The CBC Championship or CaribeBasket is a FIBA-sponsored international basketball tournament where national teams from the Caribbean participate. These countries are members of the Caribbean Basketball Confederation (CBC). The top three or four teams typically earn berths to the Centrobasket where they compete for spots in the FIBA AmeriCup, from which they can qualify for the FIBA Basketball World Cup or Summer Olympics. There are currently 24 Caribbean countries that may compete in this event.

Celebration of the tournament typically is every two years. Puerto Rico is traditionally the strongest team from this region winning Gold in 1985 with players like NBA hopeful Ramon Ramos and Ferdinand Martinez (MVP). They rarely compete as the squad usually has already earned a berth in the subsequent Centrobasket. Until 2002, this tournament was called the CARICOM Basketball Championship. Through 2014, the tournament had been held 22 times.

Men's tournament

Summaries

Championships per nation (incomplete)

Participation details

Women's tournament

Summaries

External links
 2022 Women's Tournament
 2014 Tournament
 2011 Tournament
 2009 Tournament
 2007 Tournament
 2006 Tournament
 2004 Tournament
 2002 Tournament
 2000 Tournament
 1998 Tournament
 
 FIBA Archive 2004–2009
 Guyana History
 Guyana's women win first Caribbean basketball title

 
Basketball competitions in North America between national teams
International sports competitions in the Caribbean